Big Salmon Creek is a stream in Mendocino County, California in the United States.

See also
List of rivers of California

Notes

Rivers of Mendocino County, California
Rivers of Northern California